Bangkuruan Island is an island located near Beluran district in Sabah, Malaysia.

See also
 List of islands of Malaysia

External links 

Islands of Sabah